John Parkhill may refer to:

John Parkhill, pseudonym of William R. Cox
John Parkhill, owner of Parkhill Mill
John Parkhill, a member of the Leon County Volunteers who was killed by Seminoles and has a monument on the grounds of the Florida State Capitol